The Brodina is a right tributary of the river Suceava in Romania. It discharges into the Suceava in the village Brodina.

References

Rivers of Romania
Rivers of Suceava County